Baby Wildebeest is a fictional character in appearing in American comic books published by DC Comics.

Publication history
Baby Wildebeest was introduced in New Teen Titans vol. 2 #85 (April 1992) and was created by Marv Wolfman and Tom Grummett.

Fictional character biography
The Wildebeest Society experimented with genetically-created host bodies to house the tainted souls of Azarath. The Baby Wildebeest was their only successful experiment, before the organization was destroyed by the New Titans. Taking care of the infant creature, the Titans soon realized that it could transform to a grown-up Wildebeest, and let him join the team. Much to Pantha's annoyance, 'Baby' has always regarded her as his mother. Although the size of a human toddler, he had disproportionately powerful strength. He later demonstrated the ability to gain adult form to protect his "Momma". Pantha originally didn't like the creature, often talking about various ways Baby could or would die. Her attitude softened as Wildebeest stayed with the team.

During a Titans vacation to California, Baby Wildebeest and the other Titans had time to visit the beach. While the others were distracted, he built a gigantic sandcastle, with intricate shapes and molding, resembling a cathedral.

After the New Titans disbanded, Pantha took Baby Wildebeest with her and later, along with former Titan Red Star, the three formed an unusual family unit. The three resided in Solar City in Russia, where Pantha and Red Star raise Baby Wildebeest as their son.

Baby Wildebeest would participate in the battle to save his old friend Cyborg, whose magnified power levels threatened the entire Earth. A series of misunderstandings led to the Titans' allies attacking the JLA. Baby Wildebeest was knocked out by Superman.

During the "Infinite Crisis" storyline, Superboy-Prime was confronted by a team of Titans (including Wildebeest and Pantha) on a highway outside of Keystone City. A mentally-ill Superboy-Prime kills Pantha with a blow to the head. Baby Wildebeest attacks and is killed instantly by a heat vision blast through his torso. Red Star survives the battle to mourn his family.

Baby Wildebeest was seen revived as a Black Lantern in the Blackest Night crossover. He has been seen with Black Lantern versions of Aqualad, Aquagirl, Dolphin, and Pantha.

Powers and abilities
Baby Wildebeest had incredible strength, stamina, and enhanced durability. When provoked, he became a twelve-foot powerhouse and is strong enough to take blows from Superman himself.

In other media

Elements of Baby Wildebeest are incorporated into Teen Titans and Teen Titans Go!s incarnation of Wildebeest.

References

External links
 Baby Wildebeest at DC Wiki
 Baby Wildebeest at Comic Vine
 Baby Wildebeest at Titans Tower

Comics characters introduced in 1992
Characters created by Marv Wolfman
DC Comics superheroes
DC Comics metahumans
DC Comics characters with superhuman strength
Fictional genetically engineered characters